The 2014–15 CA Osasuna season is the 94th season in the club's history.

Season overview

July
On 3 July: The polish former striker Jan Urban makes his return to El Sadar as coach for his former club Osasuna. On 4 July, Argentine winger Emiliano Armenteros agreed to terminate the contract he signed two years prior and which was set to expire on 30 June 2015. He subsequently signed a two-year deal for Mexican Tuxtla Gutiérrez side Chiapas for a €7.5 million transfer fee. On 9 July, Jan Urban confirmed the official presentation of Osasuna pre-season matches on 14 July.

August

September

October

November

December

January

February
On 1 February, referee José María Sánchez Martínez suspended Osasuna's match with Real Zaragoza at El Sadar due to snow accumulation on the pitch.

March

April

May

June

Current squad

Players and staff

Squad information

Transfer in

 
  
 

 

   

Total spending:  €0

Transfer out

 

 
 
    

   
 
Total Spending:  €4,600,000

Technical staff

Kits

|
|
| 
|

Friendlies

Pre-season

Legend

Friendlies

Competitions

Overall

Liga Adelante

Legend

Matches
Kickoff times are in CET and CEST

Results by round

Results summary

League table

Copa del Rey

Second round

Statistics

Top goalscorers

Assists

Minutes played

Bookings

Match statistics
{|class="wikitable" style="text-align: center;"
|-
! style="width:70px;"|Match stats
! style="width:70px;"|Liga Adelante
! style="width:70px;"|Copa del Rey
! style="width:70px;"|Total 
|-
|align=left|Games played || 32 || 1 || 33
|- 
|align=left|Games won || 8 || 0 || 8 
|- 
|align=left|Games drawn || 8 || 0 || 8  
|- 
|align=left|Games lost || 16 || 1 || 16 
|-
|align=left|Goals scored || 29 || 0 || 29
|-
|align=left|Goals conceded || 50 || 2 || 50 
|- 
|align=left|Goal difference || -19 || -2 || -21
|-
|align=left|Clean sheets || 7 || 0 || 7
|-
|align=left|Goal by substitute ||  ||  ||
|-
|align=left|Total shots || 264 || 15 ||
|-
|align=left|Shots on target || 104 || 4 ||
|-
|align=left|Shots off target || 151 || 11 ||
|-   
|align=left|Corners || 154 || 4 || 155
|-
|align=left|Players used || 28 || 14 || 42 
|-
|align=left|Offsides || 74 || 4 ||
|-
|align=left|Fouls suffered || 439 || 21 ||
|-
|align=left|Fouls committed || 205 || 21 ||
|-
|align=left|Yellow cards || 88 || 2 || 90
|- 
|align=left|Red cards || 10 || 0 || 10

References

Osasuna
CA Osasuna seasons